Children's Mercy Park is a soccer-specific stadium in Kansas City, Kansas, United States, and is the home of Sporting Kansas City. The stadium is located near Kansas Speedway, on the far west side of Wyandotte County, Kansas. It opened during the 2011 season of Major League Soccer on June 9, 2011 with a match against the Chicago Fire. The stadium has a seating capacity of 18,467 seats, which can expand to 25,000 for concerts. Most SKC games attract around 21,000 because of different stadium modes. The stadium is Sporting Kansas City's third home venue; then known as the Kansas City Wizards, the team played in Arrowhead Stadium from 1996 to 2007 and CommunityAmerica Ballpark from 2008 to 2010. In 2013, the stadium hosted the MLS All-Star Game, the United States men's national soccer team, and the MLS Cup, and is the only stadium to host all three in the same year.

History

Initial planning
Originally, Sporting Club, the team's ownership group, planned to move to southeast Kansas City, Missouri on land previously occupied by Bannister Mall. The redevelopment plan, called The Trails, was passed on December 13, 2007. The last package of economic incentives, a $30-million tax rebate, was passed on November 21, 2008.

The stadium's planned site had been demolished to prepare the site for infrastructure. It was intended to open in 2011 with a capacity of 18,500 seats. However, fallout from the 2008–2009 financial crisis placed the project on hiatus, and the stadium developer eventually sought to move the new project near the Village West retail center in Kansas City, Kansas, near the Kansas Speedway and CommunityAmerica Ballpark. The developer of The Trails complex sought additional borrowing authority from Kansas City, Missouri, to finance the building of the soccer stadium and its associated amateur soccer complex. However, the city was unwilling to provide the desired financing, leading the developer to seek a new site across the state line.

Construction

In September 2009, the developer asked Wyandotte County and Kansas state officials for permission to use revenues from existing tax increment financing in the Village West area to help finance the soccer complex.  On December 17, Sporting KC president, Robb Heineman provided an update on the stadium situation published on team official website and blog, basically putting the Kansas City, Kansas location as final, pending the signature of the final agreements.  On December 21, construction machinery was already on the Legends site waiting to break ground on the site.  On January 19, Wyandotte County approved the bonds to help finance the stadium, and on January 20, the groundbreaking ceremony happened with Sporting's CEO, Robb Heineman, using heavy machinery to move dirt on the construction site.

Inaugural season
The opening match took place on June 9, 2011, as Sporting played the Chicago Fire to a scoreless draw in front of an over-capacity crowd of 19,925. The first goal would come days later during the 2011 CONCACAF Gold Cup when Dwayne De Rosario converted a penalty kick for Canada against Panama. Sporting's first goal came from C. J. Sapong in a 1–0 win over the San Jose Earthquakes, the club's first victory in the stadium. Sporting would finish its first regular season in the stadium with a 9–2–6 record at home.  Average attendance was 17,810 for the year or 96.4% of capacity.

2012–present
In the stadium's second season, Sporting KC averaged an attendance of 19,404, 105% of its capacity. That year, Sporting KC made it to the playoffs but lost to the Houston Dynamo in the conference semifinals, and won the US Open Cup by defeating the Seattle Sounders.

In 2013, Sporting KC once again raised their average attendance. Because of their 2012 US Open Cup win, they qualified for the CONCACAF Champions League, and played games both in the MLS and in CONCACAF. Children's Mercy Park also hosted to a World Cup qualifying match between the United States and Jamaica with an attendance of 18,467, where the United States shut out Jamaica 2–0, and the 2013 MLS All-Star Game between A.S. Roma and the MLS All-Stars with an attendance of 21,175, where A.S. Roma beat the All-Stars 3–1. Sporting KC set an attendance record of 21,650 in the playoffs when they defeated the Houston Dynamo 2–1 to advance to the MLS Cup Finals against Real Salt Lake, Sporting won in penalty kicks, the second final in two years to be hosted at Children's Mercy Park.

Also in 2013, it was announced that the 2014 through 2018 NCAA Division II Football Championships would be played at Children's Mercy Park, moving from Braly Municipal Stadium in Florence, Alabama. It was also announced that the 2015 NCAA College Cup would be played at Children's Mercy Park.

In 2015, the stadium hosted FC Kansas City's home opener against fellow NWSL side Sky Blue FC. The stadium also hosted two FC Kansas City matches in 2016, once again serving as the team's secondary stadium.

The stadium announced in 2016 that they are adding a Skycam, as well as robo-cams behind the goals and on top of the stadium.

During a CONCACAF Champions League match against Deportivo Toluca F.C. on February 21, 2019, a metal railing overlooking the southwest tunnel broke and caused several fans to fall. Toluca winger Felipe Pardo was injured with a toe fracture because of the railing.

International matches

Children's Mercy Park hosted its first international match with the final Group C matches of the 2011 CONCACAF Gold Cup. Canada and Panama played to a 1–1 draw in this match, which was followed by the stadium's first-ever USA match, a 1–0 win over Guadeloupe.

The stadium played host to its first-ever women's match when it hosted the United States women's team in its first match since the 2011 FIFA Women's World Cup, a 1–1 draw with Canada witnessed by a crowd of 16,191.

Children's Mercy Park played host to the semifinals and final of the 2012 CONCACAF Men's Olympic Qualifying Tournament.

Men's matches

Women's matches

Stadium naming rights
On March 8, 2011 a partnership with Lance Armstrong's Livestrong Foundation was announced. The club was to donate a portion of revenues, no less than $7.5 million, to the foundation over the course of six years. On January 15, 2013, Livestrong and Sporting Kansas City agreed to terminate the naming agreement.

On November 19, 2015, a ten-year partnership with Children's Mercy Hospital was announced, renaming the stadium to Children's Mercy Park.

Attendance records
The 2013 MLS All-Star Game on July 31, 2013 between the MLS All-Stars and A.S. Roma set a record attendance of 21,175 including standing room only tickets. One week later, Sporting set a new attendance record in a loss against New York Red Bulls on August 3 with 21,304 people. On November 23, 2013, Sporting set the record once again, reaching a fire-code capacity crowd of 21,650 in the Eastern Conference Final win against the Houston Dynamo. Two weeks later, on December 7, the team tied the record in a penalty kick win against Real Salt Lake in the MLS Cup 2013. On June 6, 2015, Sporting set a record for regular season attendance at 21,505 in a 1–0 win over Seattle Sounders FC.

Recognition and awards
2014 Best Stadium Experience in MLS | Stadium Journey 

Winner of the 2012 "Venue of the Year Award" and "Community Award" – TheStadiumBusiness Awards 2012.

One of 4 finalists for "Sports Facility of the Year" – 2012 Sports Business Awards from Street & Smith's SportsBusiness Journal and SportsBusiness Daily.

One of 8 finalists for "New Venue Award" – TheStadiumBusiness Awards 2012.

References

Notes
1. The 2014 CONCACAF Women's Championship served as CONCACAF's 2015 FIFA Women's World Cup qualification

External links

Virtual Venue view of seating
Children's Mercy Park at StadiumDB.com

Sporting Kansas City
College football venues
CONCACAF Gold Cup stadiums
Major League Soccer stadiums
American football venues in Kansas
Soccer venues in Kansas
Buildings and structures in Kansas City, Kansas
Tourist attractions in Wyandotte County, Kansas
FC Kansas City
Sports venues completed in 2011
2011 establishments in Kansas